Munshi Abdul Latif is a Bangladeshi politician and a former Jatiya Sangsad member representing the Rajbari-1 constituency.

Career
Latif was elected to parliament from Rajbari-1 as a combined opposition candidate in 1988.

References

Living people
Jatiya Party politicians
4th Jatiya Sangsad members
Year of birth missing (living people)
Place of birth missing (living people)